Esteban José Enderica Salgado (born 30 October 1990 in Cuenca) is an Ecuadorian swimmer who competes in the men's 400m individual medley and open water swimming events. At the 2012 Summer Olympics he finished 29th overall in the heats in the men's 400 metre individual medley and failed to reach the final.  At the 2016 Olympics, he competed in the 1500 m freestyle and 10 km open water marathon, finishing in 23rd and 16th place respectively.

References

Ecuadorian male swimmers
1990 births
Living people
Olympic swimmers of Ecuador
Swimmers at the 2012 Summer Olympics
Swimmers at the 2016 Summer Olympics
Male medley swimmers
Swimmers at the 2011 Pan American Games
Swimmers at the 2015 Pan American Games
Swimmers at the 2019 Pan American Games
Pan American Games bronze medalists for Ecuador
Pan American Games medalists in swimming
South American Games gold medalists for Ecuador
South American Games silver medalists for Ecuador
South American Games bronze medalists for Ecuador
South American Games medalists in swimming
Competitors at the 2010 South American Games
Competitors at the 2014 South American Games
Competitors at the 2018 South American Games
Medalists at the 2015 Pan American Games
Medalists at the 2019 Pan American Games
21st-century Ecuadorian people